Kemppi Oy is a Finnish family owned welding company founded in 1949 by Martti Kemppi. It designs, and manufactures manual arc welding equipment, welding safety equipment and software, and automated welding machines. It also provides expert services in this field. In 2019, Kemppi had subsidiaries in 16 countries in addition to Finland. It employed over 800 people, half of them in Lahti city where the company also has its headquarters. In 2013 Kemppi's electronics factory was the largest in Finland. Kemppi's main business areas are Europe and Asia.

History

1949-1999

The electrician Martti Kemppi founded a small repair shop in 1949. The workshop was located in the outbuilding of his home, initially producing concrete carts, milk carts, sauna stoves and welding transformers. In the 1950s, the company began to focus on welding equipment and developed its first welding rectifier. Kemppi's export business began in 1955, supplying 20 welding machines to Turkey. Veljekset Kemppi Oy started manufacturing welding rectifiers, which were manufactured by only two companies worldwide.

In the 1960s, Kemppi developed its first MIG/MAG welding machine in addition to a thyristor-controlled rectifier. In the mid-1960s, the company manufactured 50% of Finnish welding transformers and various electrical equipment for industry. Kemppi exported to 30 countries. In 1968 the name of the company was shortened to Kemppi Oy. At the end of the decade, a thyristor controlled Tylarc power supply was introduced.

The first subsidiary was established in Sweden in 1972. In 1977 Kemppi introduced the world's first inverter power supply for welding which revolutionized arc welding. The Hilarc inverter family was introduced at Essen welding exhibition.

In 1980, Martti Kemppi's son Jouko Kemppi was appointed CEO. The company employed over 650 people. During the 1980s, the company established subsidiaries in several countries in Europe. Kemppi introduced new, lighter and more compact Multisystem industrial inverters.

In 1993, Kemppi launched the world's first digital welding power source called Kemppi Pro. Kemppi launched the Mastertig AC/DC welding equipment using the latest digital control technology.

2000–2013
In the early 2000s, CERN, the European Organization for Nuclear Research, ordered Kemppi and its subsidiary Kempower to supply 200 special power supplies to its new LHC particle accelerator.

In 2005, Kemppi's net sales increased by approximately 13 percent to EUR 88 million. The company was debt-free and invested in product development, which employed nearly 10 percent of the employees. The company was one of the leaders in welding, both in technology and in sales and marketing, with subsidiaries in 15 countries, Australia being the furthest away.

In 2007, Kemppi Capital, the parent company of Kemppi Oy, announced investing approximately EUR 10 million in a new industrial property to be built in Lahti and an extension of 5 million in its existing industrial property. The company had a turnover of EUR 120 million and exported about 90% of its production. Kemppi had two production units in Finland and 730 employees, 135 of whom worked abroad.

In 2011, Kemppi opened its first foreign production plant in India.

2014–present 
Teresa Kemppi-Vasama and her cousin Antti Kemppi took over the management of the family business in 2014, when Kemppi-Vasama became Chairman of Kemppi Oy and Kemppi became Chairman of Kemppi Group Oy. Kemppi wanted to be a forerunner in the Industrial Internet of things. It introduced the first universal welding production management software. Kemppi acquired software expertise through acquisitions, JPP-Soft in Lahti and Weldindustry in Norway.

In 2015, the company's net sales were EUR 114 million, of which approximately 60 per cent came from Europe. Asia was the second largest market area. In Asia, Kemppi had subsidiaries in China, Malaysia and India, where the Chennai assembly plant was also located. In Singapore, the company had a logistics center operated by a subcontractor.

In 2018, Kemppi relocated the production operations of Chennai to Lahti, Finland, where approximately 100,000 welding machines are manufactured each year. Kemppi had a turnover of more than 120 million and over 600 employees.

In 2019, Kemppi acquired the Italian torch manufacturer Trafimet Group, which had been operating in the welding industry for over 40 years. The company had a turnover of more than EUR 30 million and more than 200 employees. Trafimet continues to operate under its own brand and owns the brands Trafimet, Sacit and Ferro. Kemppi concentrated its torch and welding gun production in Wuxi, China, as most of its supplier network is located in China. The factory employs about 70 people. Kemppi opened new robotic welding application centers in India and China. They improve interaction with end-users and system vendors.

Organisation
Kemppi employed more than 800 people at the end of 2019, about half of whom were in Lahti, which also has its corporate headquarters, R&D department and assembly and electronics factory. The company has production plants in Lahti region, Finland.

80 percent of Kemppi's sales comes from the dealer network. Dealers handle almost all sales of accessories (such as protective equipment, wire feeders, cables, torches, and consumables) to consumers and small businesses. Kemppi has outsourced the maintenance of its equipment to its dealers.

Products and services
Kemppi Oy designs and manufactures arc welding equipment to its customers worldwide. It provides MIG/MAG welding products, such as compact machines, MIG welding sets and guns, and accessories; TIG welding products, including DC and AC/DC TIG welding products, TIG torches, and accessories; MMA welding equipment; welding automation products; and accessories, such as welding helmets, panels, monitoring products, remote control units, cables and connectors, hanging devices and swing arms, transport units, and consumable parts. The company also offers welding gun, wire feed mechanism, power source, cooling unit, and TIG welding torch maintenance services. Its products are used in metal fabrication workshops; automotive industry; construction; chemical, process, and oil and gas industries; shipbuilding and offshore; welding automation; and other applications. In recent years the company has also expanded its product lineup into automated welding monitoring, pioneering tools for demanding industrial construction and manufacturing.

Kemppi produces welding devices for shipbuilding, offshore, transportation, construction, engineering, and automotive industries. Power sources and the related know-how are the core of Kemppi's operations.

New products developed in the 2010s record all welding events in the cloud, for example the welder of the item, the parameters and materials used in the job. This helps customers prevent or detect welding deviations and anticipate equipment maintenance. Welding documentation is measured up to thousands of pages depending on the site. In a digital format, the information is ideally an insurance for the customer.

MIG/MAG welding:
System:
 X8 MIG Welder
 FastMig X
 FastMig M
 X3 MIG Welder
Compact:
 Kempact RA
 Kempact MIG
Portable:
 MinarcMig Evo
 FitWeld Evo
TIG welding:
Compact:
 MasterTig 
 MasterTig MLS 4000
 MasterTig AC/DC
Portable:
 MinarcTig
 MinarcTig Evo
MMA welding:
 Master MLS
 Master S
 Minarc Evo
 Minarc
Automated welding:
 A7 MIG Welder
 A3 MIG Welder
 KempArc Pulse
 KempArc Synergic
 A5 MIG Rail System 2500
 A3 MIG Rail System 2500
 A5 MIG Orbital System 1500
 MagTrac F61

See also
List of Finnish companies

References

Manufacturing companies of Finland
Manufacturing companies established in 1949
Finnish companies established in 1949